Edem Komlan Franck Atsou (born 1 August 1978 in Lomé) is a Togolese former football player who last played for Esteghlal Ahvaz in the Iran Pro League.

Position
He usually played as a defender.

Club career
He moved to the Iranian Club Aboomoslem in 2006 and spent 2 seasons with them before joining the champions Persepolis in 2008 where he stayed for a season and moved to Esteghlal Ahvaz where his team relegated.

International career
He won 46 caps for Togo, the first of which came on 3 November 1996 against Gabon. He was a member of the Togo squad for the 2006 FIFA World Cup.

Club career statistics

Club career statistics
Last Update  1 June 2010 

 Assist Goals

References

External links

1978 births
Living people
Togolese footballers
Togolese expatriate footballers
Togo international footballers
2000 African Cup of Nations players
2006 FIFA World Cup players
Expatriate footballers in Iran
F.C. Aboomoslem players
Expatriate footballers in Saudi Arabia
Al Hilal SFC players
Challenger Pro League players
Expatriate footballers in Belgium
Persepolis F.C. players
Expatriate footballers in Ghana
Asante Kotoko S.C. players
Africa Sports d'Abidjan players
Expatriate footballers in Ivory Coast
Togolese expatriate sportspeople in Ivory Coast
Étoile Filante du Togo players
Togolese expatriate sportspeople in Ghana
Association football defenders
Persian Gulf Pro League players
21st-century Togolese people